The Mainit Hot Springs Protected Landscape is a protected landscape area located in the province of Davao de Oro on the island of Mindanao in the Philippines. It preserves the sulfuric hot springs and surrounding forest in Nabunturan municipality which also contains the headwaters of the Manat River, a source of water supply for surrounding villages. Under the National Integrated Protected Areas System, it was reclassified as a protected landscape through Proclamation No. 320 issued in 2000 by President Joseph Estrada. The hot springs are a popular ecotourist attraction in Davao de Oro. Its name "Mainit" is a Filipino word which means hot.

Geography
It is located near the border with the municipality of Maco in the Leonard Mountain Range just north of Lake Leonard. The park is composed of a network of springs, waterfalls and streams that flow through the volcanic mountains into the Manat River, a tributary of the Agusan River. These include the Inoparan Creek, Matagdungan Creek, Saosao River, Tigabaca Creek, Esolvin Creek and Tawangan Creek in the Manat River Basin which supplies water to the villages of Mainit and Bukal. The park also contains over thirty caves, rock formations and patches of surviving primary and secondary growth dipterocarp forests.

The area is home to an indigenous tribe called Mansaka. Near the hot springs, several cottages and pools have been built for the tourists. The Toyozu Inland Resort can also be found within Mainit and a reservoir has also been built.

Biodiversity
The forests of the Mainit protected area support several old dipterocarp and giant fern species. Fifty percent of its forest cover is Yemane and Falcata plantations, while shrub species inhabit the rest such as hagimit, binunga, and himlaumo.

The park hosts several avifauna species including the red-keeled flowerpecker, Asian glossy starling, grey imperial pigeon, Philippine turtle dove, Philippine coucal, olive-backed sunbird, yellow-vented bulbul, zebra dove, collared kingfisher, and the endangered green-winged dove. In the caves on the slopes flanking the river basin, swiftlets known as sayaw-sayaw, and several small to medium-sized native bats producing guano fertilizers can also be found. Some of the park's large mammals include the long-tailed macaque, Asian palm civet, Philippine tree squirrel, and Celebes warty pig. It is also known to harbor reticulated pythons and water monitors.

References

Protected landscapes of the Philippines
Hot springs of the Philippines
Geography of Davao de Oro
Landforms of Davao de Oro
Protected areas established in 1957
1957 establishments in the Philippines